Private Road is a 1971 British drama film directed by Barney Platts-Mills and starring Susan Penhaligon  and Bruce Robinson.

Plot
Peter Morrisey (Bruce Robinson) is an author who has just published his first novel. He meets receptionist Ann Halpern (Susan Penhaligon) and falls in love. They spend some time in a cottage in Scotland living an idyllic pastoral life, then return to London. Peter gets a job at an advertising agency as a copywriter. Ann becomes pregnant and Peter asks her to marry him but she refuses. To Peter's shock, Ann decides to have an abortion without talking to him about it first. After a spell in hospital Ann returns home and her father gives her a house. Peter returns to his flat alone, still thinking that he will marry Ann. With his friend Stephen, Peter breaks into an office block and steals a typewriter so he can resume his writing career.

Cast
 Susan Penhaligon as Ann Halpern
 Bruce Robinson as Peter Morrissey
 Michael Feast as Stephen
 Robert Brown as Mr. Halpern
 George Fenton as Henry
 Kathleen Byron as Mrs. Halpern
 Patricia Cutts as Erica Talbot
 Trevor Adams as Alex Marvel

Awards
The film won the Golden Leopard at the Locarno International Film Festival.

Home media

After several years out of print it was reissued on Blu-ray and DVD by the BFI in 2011 as part of their Flipside reissue program.

References

External links
 

1971 films
1971 drama films
British drama films
Films scored by George Fenton
Films about writers
Films directed by Barney Platts-Mills
Films set in London
Golden Leopard winners
1970s English-language films
1970s British films